On 20 February 1947, a large accidental explosion at the O'Connor Plating Works at 926 East Pico Boulevard in Los Angeles killed seventeen people and injured more than one hundred. Eleven nearby buildings were damaged beyond repair. Press reports mentioned a  crater.

The explosion was caused by the improper handling of perchloric acid, which the plant was using as an experimental method for polishing aluminum. On the day of the accident, the cooling unit required to store perchloric acid safely was not working.

Dick Lane, a Los Angeles television announcer, was working for the experimental television station W6XYZ located nearby and quickly began broadcasting from the disaster site. Two days later, the station was licensed for commercial operation as KTLA-TV.

In popular culture 
The event served as the main inspiration for "Nicholson Electroplating", a fictional case featured in the 2011 video game L.A. Noire as downloadable content.

See also
 SS Sansinena oil tanker that exploded in Los Angeles.

References

Industrial fires and explosions in the United States 
1947 disasters in the United States 
1947 in California
Explosions in 1947
History of Los Angeles